The 2011–12 season was the 124th season of competitive association football played by Walsall. It was the club's fifth consecutive season in League One since achieving promotion during the 2006–07 season. The club also competed in the FA Cup, League Cup and Football League Trophy.

League table

Squad statistics
Source:

Numbers in parentheses denote appearances as substitute.
Players with squad numbers struck through and marked  left the club during the playing season.
Players with names in italics and marked * were on loan from another club for the whole of their season with Walsall.
Players listed with no appearances have been in the matchday squad but only as unused substitutes.
Key to positions: GK – Goalkeeper; DF – Defender; MF – Midfielder; FW – Forward

Results

Pre-season friendlies

League One

FA Cup

League Cup

Football League Trophy

Transfers

References 

2011-12
2011–12 Football League One by team